Silver Lake Provincial Park is a provincial park in British Columbia, Canada, located in the Skagit River Valley just south of Hope and comprising 77 hectares.

References

Canadian Cascades
Provincial parks of British Columbia
Lower Mainland
Protected areas established in 1964
1964 establishments in British Columbia